The Second Itō Cabinet is the fifth Cabinet of Japan led by Itō Hirobumi from August 8, 1892, to August 31, 1896.

Cabinet 

Following Itō's resignation as Prime Minister, Kuroda Kiyotaka became acting Prime Minister from August 31 until September 18, 1896.

References 

Cabinet of Japan
1892 establishments in Japan
Cabinets established in 1892
Cabinets disestablished in 1896